The keel-bellied water snake (Bitia hydroides)  is a marine homalopsine snake. It belongs to the monotypic genus Bitia.

Geographic range
It is found in Malaysia.

Dentition
Bitia hydroides is noted for its unusual dentition. In all other snakes, any enlarged teeth are located on the dentary or maxilla, with the inner, palatine teeth of the upper jaw being smaller. In Bitia hydroides, the palatine teeth are greatly enlarged. Not enough is known about this animal's feeding behavior or ecology to attempt to infer a function of this peculiar arrangement.

See also
Snake skull
Snake dentition

References

http://www.jstor.org/stable/1447028
Lu, S.; Pang, J.; Yang, D. 2006. Morphological phylogeny of the water snake subfamily Homalopsinae (Serpent: Colubridae). Zoological Research 27 (4): 363–366.
Manthey, U. & Grossmann, W. 1997. "Amphibien & Reptilien Südostasiens". Natur und Tier Verlag (Münster), 512 pp.
Murphy, John C. 2007. Homalopsid Snakes: Evolution in the Mud. Krieger Publishing, Malabar, Florida, 249 pp.
Smedley, N. 1931. Notes on some Malaysian snakes. Bull. Raffl. Mus. No 5: 49–54
Smith, M.A. 1943. The Fauna of British India, Ceylon and Burma, Including the Whole of the Indo-Chinese Sub-Region. Reptilia and Amphibia. 3 (Serpentes). Taylor and Francis, London. 583 pp.
Stoliczka, F. 1870. Observations of some Indian and Malayan Amphibia and Reptilia. Ann. Mag. Nat. Hist. (4) 6: 105–109
Taylor, E.H. 1965. The serpents of Thailand and adjacent waters. Univ. Kansas Sci. Bull. 45 (9): 609–1096
Voris, Harold K., Michael E. Alfaro, Daryl R. Karns, G. Lucas Starnes, Emma Thompson and John C. Murphy 2002. Phylogenetic relationships of the Oriental-Australian rear-fanged water snakes (Colubridae: Homalopsinae) based on Mitochondrial DNA sequences. Copeia 2002 (4): 906–915
Voris, Harold K., Bruce C. Jayne, Todd J. Ward. "Morphology, Reproduction, and Diet of the Marine Homalopsine Snake Bitia hydroides in Peninsular Malaysia.". Copeia, Vol. 1995, No. 4 (Dec. 21, 1995), pp. 800–808.

Homalopsidae
Reptiles described in 1842
Taxa named by John Edward Gray